Woodlawn Township is an inactive township in Monroe County, in the U.S. state of Missouri.

Woodlawn Township was established in 1854, taking its name from the community of Woodlawn, Missouri.

References

Townships in Missouri
Townships in Monroe County, Missouri